The 1910 American Cup was the annual open cup held by the American Football Association. Twenty-nine teams entered the competition. Tacony F.C. became champions of this edition after defeating the Scottish Americans 2-1 in the final round.

American Cup Bracket

(*) forfeit

Final

Amer
American Cup